Johann Agust Sutter House is a historic home located at Lititz, Lancaster County, Pennsylvania. It was built in 1871, and is a -story, brick dwelling with a gable roof in a Late Victorian style.  It measures 30 feet wide by 42 feet deep. In the 1930s, it was modified for commercial use.  This included a rear brick addition and a concrete block addition on that.  It was restored in the 1980s.  It was the home of California pioneer Johann August Sutter (1803 – 1880).  He moved to Lititz in 1871, and built this home.

It was listed on the National Register of Historic Places in 1982. It is located in the Lititz Moravian Historic District.

References

Lititz, Pennsylvania
Houses on the National Register of Historic Places in Pennsylvania
Houses completed in 1871
Houses in Lancaster County, Pennsylvania
National Register of Historic Places in Lancaster County, Pennsylvania